Amukhanzi or Amu Khanzi may refer to:
 Amukhanzi-ye Olya
 Amukhanzi-ye Sofla